The Vostochny Cosmodrome Site 1S (Russian: Площадka-1C)  is a launch complex at the Vostochny Cosmodrome in Russia. It consists of a single pad for use by the Soyuz-2 launch vehicles.

On 28 April 2016, the first launch from the Vostochny Cosmodrome took place from this pad. The third launch took place on 1 February 2018. The Meteor M2-2 mission, the fifth launch from this site, took place 5 July 2019. Since December 2020, Arianespace uses this site to launch OneWeb satellites, with 6 batches launched as for 14 October 2021.

Launch history

References 

Soviet and Russian space program locations
Rocket launch sites in Russia
Buildings and structures in Amur Oblast
Transport infrastructure completed in 2016
2016 establishments in Russia